Enyo bathus is a moth of the  family Sphingidae. It is known from Peru and Bolivia.

It is similar to Enyo gorgon and Enyo taedium taedium, but there are no patches of woolly scaling on the abdomen. The forewing upperside is intermediate in pattern between these two species. The anterior half of the wing has a dark brown, median, longitudinal line that diverges apically to form a dark brown triangular patch. The line is followed by a marginal pale brown half-moon shaped patch.

There are probably two to three generations per year.

Subspecies
Enyo bathus bathus (Peru)
Enyo bathus otiosus Kernbach, 1957 (Bolivia)

References

Enyo (moth)
Moths described in 1904